Flixton Girls' School (formerly Flixton Girls' High School) is a secondary school with academy status, located in the Flixton area of the borough of Trafford, Greater Manchester, England.

The school first opened in 1933 and converted to academy status in 2011. The school now admits girls of all abilities.

Flixton Girls' School opened a new, female only, sixth form in September 2013, in partnership with Trafford College. Girls in the sixth form have the option to study from a range of A-levels and BTECs.

Notable alumni
 Yasmin Lauryn, member of Four of Diamonds
 Stephanie Waring, actress

References

http://www.flixtongirls.com/the-sixth-form/sixth-form-introduction/

External links
Flixton Girls' School official website

Girls' schools in Greater Manchester
Schools in Flixton
Secondary schools in Trafford
Educational institutions established in 1933
1933 establishments in England
Academies in Trafford